Mark Philippoussis defeated Carlos Moyá in the final, 5–7, 6–4, 6–4, 4–6, 6–2 to win the men's singles tennis title at the 1999 Indian Wells Masters.

Marcelo Ríos was the defending champion, but lost in the third round to Todd Martin.

Seeds
The top eight seeds received a bye into the second round.

Draw

Finals

Top half

Section 1

Section 2

Bottom half

Section 3

Section 4

External links
 1999 Newsweek Champions Cup draw

Newsweek Champions Cup
1999 Newsweek Champions Cup and the Evert Cup